James Swarbrick (16 May 1880 – March 1970) was a footballer who played in the English Football League.

Career
Swarbrick started his career with Blackpool Red Star, Marton Combination, and Blackpool Etrurians, before joining Blackburn Rovers in November 1901. Rovers finished fourth in the First Division in 1901–02, with Swarbrick playing 15 league games. He then joined Brentford, a club struggling in the Southern League, before signing with Grimsby Town of the Football League Second Division. He played 67 league games for the "Mariners", scoring 12 goals, before moving on to Oldham Athletic in 1907. He played for Oldham in 1907–08, their first Football League campaign, in which they posted a third-place finish, just two points behind the promotion places. He scored twice in four league games for Oldham, before moving on to Southport Central, a return to Brentford and then Stoke. He made three appearances in the Birmingham & District League for the "Potters" in 1910–11. After leaving the Victoria Ground he joined rivals Port Vale, and was a regular in the Central League side that lifted the Staffordshire Senior Cup in 1912. In 1912 he transferred to Swansea Town.

Style of play
Swarbrick was a talented and pacey dribbler.

Career statistics
Source:

Honours
Port Vale
Staffordshire Senior Cup: 1912

References

People from Lytham St Annes
English footballers
Association football midfielders
Blackburn Rovers F.C. players
Brentford F.C. players
Grimsby Town F.C. players
Oldham Athletic A.F.C. players
Stoke City F.C. players
Southport F.C. players
Port Vale F.C. players
Swansea City A.F.C. players
English Football League players
Southern Football League players
1880 births
1970 deaths